Edmund Jenkins (April 9, 1894 – 1926) was an American composer during the Harlem Renaissance.  He spent the most of his life abroad.

Jenkins studied music at Morehouse College in Atlanta with Kemper Herrald, and played and directed the bands of his father's Jenkins Orphanage in Charleston, South Carolina.  He went to England with the band in 1914 and remained there studying at the Royal Academy of Music from 1914 to 1921.

In 1925, Jenkins was awarded 1st place in the Holstein Prizes donated by Casper Holstein via Opportunity magazine for his piece, African War Dance and also 2nd place for his Sonata in A minor for violoncello. In 1925 in Belgium, his work Carlestonia, a rhapsody for orchestra—noted for its "Negro" themes—was performed.  In London, Charlestonia: Negro Symphony was performed in 1919.  His career which included jazz/dance band recordings (London: 1921) and in Europe was ended by an early death in Paris where he had settled in 1924.

References
The Music of Black Americans: A History. Eileen Southern. W. W. Norton & Company; 3rd edition. 

Guide to the Edmund Thornton Jenkins Collection, Center for Black Music Research, Columbia College Chicago

Notes

1894 births
1926 deaths
20th-century classical composers
20th-century American composers
20th-century American male musicians
American classical composers
American male classical composers
Alumni of the Royal Academy of Music
20th-century African-American musicians
Morehouse College alumni